The Playboy Mansion, also known as the Playboy Mansion West, is the former home of Playboy magazine founder Hugh Hefner who lived there from 1974 until his death in 2017. Barbi Benton convinced Hefner to buy the home located in Holmby Hills, Los Angeles, California, near Beverly Hills. From the 1970s onward the mansion became as the location of lavish parties held by Hefner which were often attended by celebrities and socialites. It is currently owned by Daren Metropoulos, the son of billionaire investor Dean Metropoulos, and is used for corporate activities. It also serves as a location for television production, magazine photography, charitable events, and civic functions.

Hefner established the original Playboy Mansion in 1959. It was a 70-room brick and limestone residence in Chicago's Gold Coast, which had been built in 1899. Hefner had founded Playboy in Chicago in 1953. After he moved to California, his company eventually let the mansion for a nominal rent to the School of the Art Institute of Chicago and then donated it to the school outright. The school later sold the mansion, which was then redeveloped for luxury condominiums.

After Hefner's death in 2017, it began to emerge publicly that sex and drug use occurred frequently at the Playboy Mansion during Hefner's lifetime.

History 

It was designed by Arthur R. Kelly in 1927 for Arthur Letts Jr., son of The Broadway department store founder Arthur Letts.

It was acquired by Playboy in 1971 for $1.1 million, from Louis D. Statham (1908–1983), an engineer, inventor and chess aficionado. In early 2011, it was valued at $54 million. It sits close to the northwestern corner of the Los Angeles Country Club, near University of California, Los Angeles, and the Bel-Air Country Club. $15 million has been invested in renovation and expansion.

The mansion has 29 rooms including a wine cellar (with a Prohibition-era secret door), a screening room with built-in pipe organ, a game room, three zoo / aviary buildings (and related pet cemetery), a tennis/basketball court, a waterfall and a swimming pool area (including a patio and barbecue area, a grotto, a basement gym with sauna below the bathhouse). Landscaping includes a large koi pond with artificial stream, a small citrus orchard and two well-established forests of tree ferns and redwoods. The west wing (originally servant's wing) housed the editorial offices of Playboy. The main aviary building is the original greenhouse, with four guest-rooms adjoining. The master suite occupies several rooms on the second and third floors, and is the most heavily renovated area of the mansion proper, with an extensive carved-oak decor dating to the 1970s. Otherwise, the mansion proper is maintained in its original Gothic-revival furnishings for the most part. The pipe organ was extensively restored in the last decade. There is also an outdoor kitchen to serve party events. These features and others have been shown on television.

The game room (game house) is a separate building on the north side. There are two sidewalks from the fountain in front of the main entrance, running past a wishing-well. That on the right leads to the game house and runs past a duplicate Hollywood Star of Hefner. Its front entrance opens to a game room with a pool table in the center. This room has vintage and modern arcade games, pinball machines, player piano, jukebox, television, stereo, and couch. The game house has two wings. Left is a room with a soft cushioned floor, mirrors all around, television. There is a restroom with a shower. The right wing of the game house has a smaller restroom and entrance to a bedroom. This bedroom is connected to another, which has an exit to the game house's rear backyard. The game house has a backyard with lounge chairs and gates on either side.

In 2006, Hefner's former girlfriend, Izabella St. James, wrote in her memoir, Bunny Tales, that the house was in need of renovation: "Everything in the Mansion felt old and stale, and Archie the house dog would regularly relieve himself on the hallway curtains, adding a powerful whiff of urine to the general scent of decay." She also observed: "Each bedroom had mismatched, random pieces of furniture. It was as if someone had gone to a charity shop and bought the basics for each room", and that: "The mattresses on our beds were disgusting – old, worn and stained. The sheets were past their best, too."

The mansion next door is a mirror image of the Playboy Mansion layout, only smaller, and was purchased by Hefner in 1996 as the home for his separated wife Kimberley Conrad and their children, Marston and Cooper. Hefner and Conrad married in 1989 and separated in 1998. In March 2009, Hefner and Conrad put the property up for sale for the asking price of $28 million. In August 2009, the property was purchased by Daren Metropoulos for $18 million.

In 2002, Hefner purchased a house across and down the street from the mansion for use by Playmates and other guests who would prefer to stay further from the busy activity of the Mansion proper. That residence was commonly referred to as the Bunny House. In April 2013, the Bunny House was listed for sale for the asking price of $11 million. In September 2017, the property was sold to an unidentified buyer for $17.25 million.

Sale of Playboy Mansion 
In January 2016, the Playboy Mansion was listed for sale by Playboy Enterprises, Inc. for the asking price of $200 million, subject to the condition Hefner be allowed to continue to rent the mansion for life. In August 2016, the Playboy Mansion was bought for $100 million by Daren Metropoulos, the co-owner of Hostess Brands and a principal in the investment firm C. Dean Metropoulos & Co. Metropoulos intends to renovate and restore the mansion to its original form.

In 2009, Metropoulos bought the mansion next door to the Playboy Mansion from Hefner and his ex-wife Kimberly Conrad, and ultimately now wants to join the two properties. The Playboy Mansion and the mansion next door owned by Metropoulos were both designed by American architect Arthur R. Kelly and each estate has a common boundary with the Los Angeles Country Club.

In May 2016, Eugena Washington was the last Playmate of the Year to be announced by Hefner at the Playboy Mansion.

Permanent protection covenant 
In March 2018, Daren Metropoulos, the owner of the Playboy Mansion, entered into an agreement with the City of Los Angeles which permanently protects the mansion from demolition. The agreement between Metropoulos and the City of Los Angeles, referred to between the parties as a "permanent protection covenant," is binding on all future owners. The agreement protects the mansion from demolition, but still allows Metropoulos to make modernizations and substantial renovations and repairs to the property "following a long period of deferred maintenance while under Playboy ownership."

Under the permanent protection covenant, Metropoulos has further agreed to restore the house and facade to "its original grandeur." The compromise agreement reversed a move in November 2017 by Los Angeles City Councilmember Paul Koretz to seek landmark status for the mansion in the hope of protecting the architectural integrity of the estate for what he called "an excellent example of a Gothic-Tudor." If designated a historic landmark, Metropoulos would have faced a lengthy process for permitting and review for the rehabilitation of the property. The permanent protection covenant avoided a potentially drawn out and contentious legal action between the City of Los Angeles and Metropoulos for the City of Los Angeles seeking the formal designation of the mansion as a historic landmark.

Original Chicago mansion 

The original Playboy Mansion was a 70-room,  classical brick and limestone residence in Chicago's Gold Coast district at 1340 North State Parkway which had been built in 1899 for Dr. George Swift Isham, a prominent surgeon whose social circle included Theodore Roosevelt and Robert Peary. The building was designed by architect James Gamble Rogers, best known for his work at Yale University and Columbia University.

In 1959, the building was acquired by Hefner. The mansion's basement, Hefner's original "grotto", had a swimming pool with a glass wall and attached bar. In addition to a game room and bowling alley, the residence contained a two-floor dormitory for Bunnies employed at the Chicago Playboy Club and discrete apartments that were occupied by several employees, including longtime Hefner aide Bobbie Arnstein.

For a period in the 1970s, Hefner divided his time between Chicago and the "Playboy Mansion West" in Los Angeles. The Chicago mansion boasted a brass plate on the door with the Latin inscription Si Non Oscillas, Noli Tintinnare ("If you don't swing, don't ring").

Although Playboy Enterprises remained headquartered in Chicago until 2012, Hefner left the city permanently for Los Angeles in 1974 following the conviction and ensuing suicide of Bobbie Arnstein, the culmination of an "investigation of drug use in Hefner's mansion" by U.S. Attorney for the Northern District of Illinois (and future Governor of Illinois) James R. Thompson. Derick Daniels (who served as president and chief operating officer of Playboy Enterprises from 1976 to 1982) resided in an apartment at the mansion during his tenure with the company. Eventually, the property was turned into a dormitory for the School of the Art Institute of Chicago, with Hefner formally deeding the building to the Art Institute in 1989. In 1993, the Chicago mansion was sold to developer Bruce Abrams and converted into seven high-price luxury condos. In 2011, one  condominium was placed for sale at an asking price of $6.7 million.

Events and appearances 

 The house can be seen in the 1966 film Madame X (before it was purchased by Playboy in the next decade).
 The Playboy Mansion was used as a film location in Beverly Hills Cop II, with Hefner as himself in a cameo role.
 The mansion hosted the Starting Line of the 12th season of CBS' long-running reality competition series The Amazing Race.
 The mansion was a main setting in the 2008 film The House Bunny, and Hugh Hefner again portrayed himself.
 The mansion's front gate appeared in the 2011 film Hop in which EB tries to request lodging in the mansion only for Hefner (in a voice-only appearance as himself, heard over the entry phone) to turn him away. Later, when the Pink Berets are searching for EB outside of the mansion, Hefner comes on the entry phone again and threatens to put a stop to what ever is going on outside. The Pink Berets respond by smashing the camera.
 The mansion is briefly mentioned in the last panel of the Big Nate comic strip October10, 2016 edition, which depicts Mr.Galvin denying Nate permission to interview him for the school newspaper, as the last time Nate wrote about him he included a photoshopped image of Mr.Galvin's head on Leonardo DiCaprio's body at the Playboy Mansion, leading readers to begin to view Mr.Galvin as a "philandering party animal."
 The mansion can be seen in Grand Theft Auto V. It has a small cave, back patio and a small bar. Topless women and older men can be found there at night.
 It is featured in a scene of the 2019 film Once Upon a Time in Hollywood

Financial 
According to Playboy Enterprises' SEC filings, Hefner paid Playboy rent for "that portion of the Playboy Mansion used exclusively for him and his personal guests' residence as well as the per-unit value of non-business meals, beverages and other benefits received by him and his personal guests". This amount was $1.3 million in 2002, $1.4 million in 2003, and $1.3 million in 2004.

Playboy paid for the Mansion's operating expenses (including depreciation and taxes), which were $3.6 million in 2002, $2.3 million in 2003, and $3.0 million in 2004, net of rent received from Hefner.

Charity events 
The Playboy Mansion has hosted charity events, including Karma Foundation, the Celebrity Poker Tournament, a fundraising party for the Marijuana Policy Project, and an event to benefit research into autism.

2011 bacterial outbreak 
In February 2011, 123 people complained of fever and respiratory illness after attending a DomainFest Global conference event held at the Playboy Mansion. After an investigation in response to the reported illnesses of the DomainFest attendees, epidemiologists from the Los Angeles County Department of Public Health disclosed their findings at a Centers for Disease Control conference the disease outbreak was traced to a hot tub in the mansion's famed grotto, where they found Legionella pneumophila, which causes Legionnaires' disease.

Sexual and drug abuse allegations 
The 2022 documentary series Secrets of Playboy featured interviews with former Playboy employees who alleged numerous acts of sexual and drug abuse took place at the mansion during Hefner's lifetime. Before the first episode of the documentary series aired on January 24, 2022, Playboy released a statement which dissociated itself from Hefner. On June 21, 2022, a California civil trial jury found that comedian Bill Cosby sexually assaulted 16 year old Judith Huth at the Playboy Mansion in 1975.

In response to Sondra Theodore's later claim that Hefner manipulated her into an orgy and hosted prostitution sex parties known as "Pig Nights" during the time she lived at the Playboy Mansion, a spokesperson for Playboy issued a statement to Fox News Digital in August 2022 claiming that "Today’s Playboy is not Hugh Hefner’s Playboy," and that "We trust and validate these women and their stories, and we strongly support those individuals who have come forward to share their experiences. As a brand with sex positivity at its core, we believe safety, security and accountability are paramount." Soon afterwards, renowned Playmate Jenny McCarthy, who was affiliated with Playboy in later time in 1993 and 1994, claimed to Fox News that she did not experience the claims described in Secrets of Playboy and that the mansion had become "almost like Catholic school" by the time she was living there, but also did not speak out against the claims made by the Secrets Of Playboy accusers, stating "I think I went in there in a window of time that was kind of safe, but hearing some of these girls’ stories was really rough."

See also 
 Stocks House

References

External links 

 World of Playboy: Inside the Mansion

1927 establishments in California
Houses completed in 1927
Playboy Mansion, The
Playboy Mansion, The
Playboy Mansion, The
Holmby Hills, Los Angeles
Gothic Revival architecture in California
Tudor Revival architecture in California